Ian Hendrickson-Smith is an American jazz saxophonist. He is best known for being a former member of Sharon Jones & the Dap-Kings from 2004 to 2010 and playing with The Roots on The Tonight Show Starring Jimmy Fallon.

Early life
Hendrickson-Smith was born in New Orleans and graduated from State College Area High School in 1992. He later studied jazz performance at the Manhattan School of Music and is equally adept on all saxophones.

Musical career
Hendrickson-Smith began his professional music career in 1996. He has worked and recorded with Lady Gaga, Bob Dylan, U2, Amy Winehouse, and Ed Sheeran throughout his career.

From 2004 to 2010, Hendrickson-Smith was a member of Sharon Jones & the Dap-Kings.

Hendrickson-Smith is currently a member of The Tonight Show band with The Roots, after joining the band in February 2014.

Personal life
Hendrickson-Smith currently resides in New York.

References

Living people
1974 births
American jazz saxophonists
American male saxophonists
American male jazz musicians
Jazz alto saxophonists
Jazz musicians from New Orleans
21st-century American saxophonists
21st-century American male musicians
The Roots members
The Tonight Show Band members
Sharon Jones & The Dap-Kings members